Gisle Elvebakken (born 27 August 1970) is a Norwegian speed skater. He was born in Tromsø. He competed in short track speed skating at the 1992 and 1994 Winter Olympics.

References

External links

1970 births
Living people
Norwegian male short track speed skaters
Olympic short track speed skaters of Norway
Short track speed skaters at the 1992 Winter Olympics
Short track speed skaters at the 1994 Winter Olympics
Sportspeople from Tromsø
Norwegian male speed skaters
20th-century Norwegian people